The 1995 DFS Classic was a women's tennis tournament played on grass courts at the Edgbaston Priory Club in Birmingham in England that was part of Tier III of the 1995 WTA Tour. The tournament was held from 12 June until 18 June 1995. In the singles match, Lori McNeil was the defending champion but lost in the final 6–3, 6–3 against Zina Garrison-Jackson.

Seeds
A champion seed is indicated in bold text while text in italics indicates the round in which that seed was eliminated. The top eight seeds received a bye to the second round.

  Lori McNeil (final)
  Gigi Fernández (third round)
  Zina Garrison-Jackson (Champion)
  Miriam Oremans (third round)
  Nathalie Tauziat (third round)
  Larisa Neiland (third round)
  Meredith McGrath (second round)
  Christina Singer (quarterfinals)
  Rachel McQuillan (first round)
  Elna Reinach (semifinals)
  Laurence Courtois (quarterfinals)
  Ai Sugiyama (first round)
  Park Sung-hee (first round)
  Pam Shriver (third round)
  Nicole Arendt (quarterfinals)
  Kristine Radford (quarterfinals)

Qualifying

Draw

Finals

Top half

Section 1

Section 2

Bottom half

Section 3

Section 4

References
 1995 DFS Classic Draws
 ITF Tournament Page
 ITF singles results page

Singles
DFS Classic - Singles